Laterbiokorshie is a suburb of the city of Accra in the Greater Accra Region of Ghana.

Famous places
Radio Gold
Presbyterian Vocational Institute
Otoo & Associates Leo Chambers

References

Greater Accra Region